The East Boston Immigration Station was an immigration station in East Boston that was built from 1919 to 1920 and operational from 1920 to 1954. In 1959, it was declared surplus and sold to the highest bidder. As of 2010, it is owned by Massport and leased as a shipyard. It is located directly to the east of the former Bethlehem Atlantic Works.

At the start of World War II, it was used as a detention center for Japanese, German and Italian immigrants deemed potentially dangerous by the government (many of whom had resided in the United States for decades and despite a lack of evidence proving their supposed risk). Their internment at East Boston was temporary; all were later transferred to more permanent facilities.

See also 
 Demographics of Boston

References

External links
Image of the building
Information on the now-demolished building

History of immigration to the United States
Immigration detention centers and prisons in the United States
East Boston
Boston Harbor
1919 establishments in Massachusetts
1954 disestablishments in Massachusetts